Michael Torrissi Jr. (born 1974) is an American Republican Party politician who has represented the 8th Legislative district in the New Jersey General Assembly since he took office on January 11, 2022.

Torissi graduated in 1993 from Hammonton High School.

In February 2011, Torissi was appointed to fill the vacant Hammonton Town Council seat that had been held by James Bertino until he resigned to take a seat on the Board of County Freeholders; he served until 2012.

District 8
Each of the 40 districts in the New Jersey Legislature has one representative in the New Jersey Senate and two members in the New Jersey General Assembly. The other representatives from the 8th District for the 2022—2023 Legislative Session are:
Senator Jean Stanfield (R)
Assemblyman Brandon Umba (R)

References

External links
Legislative webpage

Living people
1974 births
New Jersey city council members
Politicians from Atlantic County, New Jersey
Republican Party members of the New Jersey General Assembly
People from Hammonton, New Jersey